"La religieuse" (meaning "The Nun") is a song by Canadian singer Celine Dion, written and produced by French songwriter, Didier Barbelivien. It was released as a single in France in March 1988.

Background
"La religieuse" was written by French author, lyricist, songwriter and singer, Didier Barbelivien. He also produced the song. The lyrics describe a nun's struggle between her faith and memories of lovers. "La religieuse" incorporates the pipe organs frequently used in Catholic churches. It was Dion's first record issued by Carrere Records, released as a 7" single in France in March 1988. The B-side included "C'est pour toi".

Dion promoted "La religieuse" in France in April 1988. On 4 April, she performed it during TV show La classe on France 3 and on 29 April, she sang it during TV show Un DB de plus hosted by Barbelivien and aired on France 2. Dion also performed "La religieuse" on Champs-Élysées TV show hosted by Michel Drucker on France 2.

The Best of Celine Dion, released in May 1988 had a misprint of track duration 03:55 on the back cover. There is no extended version of this song.

Track listings and formats
French 7" single
"La religieuse" – 3:35
"C'est pour toi" – 4:02

References

1988 singles
1988 songs
Celine Dion songs
French-language songs
Songs written by Didier Barbelivien